The Eußerbach forms the right, northwestern headstream, over 11 kilometres long, of the Eisbach river in the county of Südliche Weinstraße, in the German federal state of Rhineland-Palatinate.

Sights 

Abbey Church (Klosterkirche) – The historically most important building in the valley of the Eußerbach is the Romanesque church of St. Bernard which belonged to the former Cistercian abbey of Eußerthal.

Viewing points – The L 505 state road, which climbs from about 170 metres above sea level in the south to heights of over 500 metres, is very picturesque and has several high viewing points. The surrounding area is largely natural.

References 

Südliche Weinstraße
Rivers and lakes of the Palatinate Forest
Rivers of Rhineland-Palatinate
Rivers of Germany